In American landlord–tenant law, a retaliatory eviction is a substantive defense and affirmative cause of action that can be used by a tenant against a landlord.  If a tenant reports sanitary violations or violations of minimum housing standards, the landlord cannot evict the tenant in retaliation for reporting the poor housing conditions.

History
Retaliatory eviction first appeared as a tenant's defense against eviction in Edwards v. Habib (1968), where a tenant was evicted after reporting sanitary code violations.  The D.C. Circuit recognized that the eviction was unjustified because it was in retaliation for the reporting of violations.

As a defense
The defense of retaliatory eviction was first recognized in the D.C. Circuit case Edwards v. Habib.

West Virginia
In the case Imperial Colliery Co. v. Fout, the West Virginia Supreme Court reaffirmed that retaliatory eviction was a valid defense against eviction, but added the condition that the retaliation must be against a tenant's exercise of a right incidental to their tenancy.  Therefore, a defense of retaliatory eviction did not exist for a tenant evicted after participating in a labor strike.

California
1942.5 is the California Civil Code that establishes a renter's rights and defines a Retaliatory Eviction in the state of California.

As a cause of action
Retaliatory eviction was first recognized as a cause of action in the California case Aweeka v. Bonds.  The case recognized the inequity of forcing the tenant to wait until they were confronted with an unlawful detainer action to bring up retaliatory eviction as a defense.

References

Landlord–tenant law
Real property law in the United States